Schuck is a surname. Notable people with the surname include:

Alexander Schuck (born 1957), East German sprint canoeist
Anett Schuck (born 1970), German canoeist
Arthur A. Schuck (1895–1963), Chief Scout Executive
Bill Schuck, American politician
Ernest F. Schuck (1929–2009), American politician
Gerson Schuck (born 1946), Brazilian volleyball player
Henrik Schück (1855–1947), Swedish literary historian, university professor and writer
John Schuck (born 1940), American actor
Lorraine Schuck, Filipino beauty pageant winner
Marina Schuck, German sprint canoeist
Robert D. Schuck (1917–2003), American politician
Tanja Schuck, German sprint canoeist
Walter Schuck (1920–2015), German World War II flying ace